Pradeep Majhi  (born 22 February 1976) is an Indian politician. He was a member of parliament in 15th Lok Sabha from Nabarangpur and is at present the State Vice-president of Odisha Pradesh Congress Committee, having held previous offices of State President of Orissa Pradesh Youth Congress, Secretary of the Indian Youth Congress, and President of Zilla Parishad.
In 15th Lok Sabha, he asked 1160 questions inside Parliament, the third-highest number questions asked in that Lok Sabha tenure. He asked 501 questions in his first two years, according to The Week magazine. In 2021, Majhi quited from Congress and joined BJD in a Mishran Parba.

Political career
Majhi is among the rising young leaders of National Congress party. He is very close to Rahul Gandhi, who is Party working-president and also in charge of the Youth Congress affairs.
Majhi from Orissa registered history, when he was appointed as the secretary of Indian Youth Congress. This is the first time a person from Orissa has been elevated to this post. While the UPA 2 government is all set to complete two years, prominent "Week' magazine came up with a detailed statistics that Congress MP from Nabarangpur, Mr Majhi has set a new record. The first-timer Lok Sabha MP asked 501 questions in two years with all-time records of 75 percentage of attendance in Parliament irrespective of his additional Orissa Youth Congress responsibilities.

Orissa Youth Congress president
Orissa Youth Congress had advanced a lot under his leadership and guidance in terms of more discipline, more agitations and movements, infusion of ample fresh bloods in party carder and most significantly propagating Rahul Gandhi's vision and message to youth across the state.

2009 Lok Sabha Elections
He was nominated by the Congress party to contest the Lok Sabha elections 2009 from Nabarangpur in Odisha. He won the 2009 Lok Sabha election by a margin of 30830 votes. During his tenure as a parliamentarian among others he played a decisive role in Food Corporation of India procuring maize at MSP from Nabarangpur farmers.

References

External links
Indian Youth Congress
Official biographical sketch in Parliament of India website

1976 births
Living people
Indian National Congress politicians from Odisha
People from Delhi
Indian Youth Congress Presidents
India MPs 2009–2014
Lok Sabha members from Odisha
People from Nabarangpur district
Odisha district councillors
Adivasi politicians